Hellinsia canari is a moth of the family Pterophoridae. It is found in Ecuador.

The wingspan is 15 mm. The forewings are pale ochreous-brown. The hindwings and fringes are brown-grey. Adults are on wing in April.

Etymology
The species is named after the Cañari people living in Ecuador in medieval times.

References

Moths described in 2011
canari
Moths of South America